Mark Famiglietti (born September 26, 1979) is an American actor, screenwriter, film producer and author. He is best known for appearing in television shows such as Hang Time and Young Americans. He also appeared in Terminator 3: Rise of the Machines.

Career
Famiglietti attended New York University as a drama major, where he studied with the Atlantic Theatre Company. During his second semester, he put college on hold and headed for Hollywood after being cast as Nick Hammer, on the NBC series Hang Time. He also guest-starred on The WB comedy Zoe, Duncan, Jack and Jane, landed the role of Scout on the short-lived WB series Young Americans.

In 2017 he wrote the book, and later a screenplay: both were named The Divorce Party.

Film and television

Bibliography

Personal
Famiglietti was born in Providence, Rhode Island. He was raised in Clinton, Connecticut. In 2007 Famiglietti was married and he has two children.

References

External links
 Mark Famiglietti Montage reel
 Scene from Terminator 3
 

1979 births
Living people
American male film actors
American male television actors
American male voice actors
Actors from Providence, Rhode Island
Male actors from Rhode Island
American screenwriters
American film producers